Mars Black may refer to:

Mars Black (artist), hip hop artist from Brooklyn, New York
Mars Black (pigment), an iron oxide pigment